The Kokama (also spelled Cocama) are an indigenous ethnic group of the Amazon that historically spoke the Cocama language. Today, the Kokama live in the countries of Peru, Brazil, and Colombia.

References 

Indigenous peoples of the Amazon